is an original video animation (OVA) created by manga artist Go Nagai.

The OVAs were also released in Italy by Dynamic Italia with the title Dimension Hunter Fandora.

Plot
The stars are a bounty hunter girl named Fandora and her shape-shifting assistant and guardian, Kwe, as they attempt to save the universe from the evil Yog-Sogoth (not to be confused with the Lovecraftian deity of a similar name). They encounter characters Gyaram, Captain PK, Sorta, Red-Eye Geran, Princess Reimia, GK, and Sorto. They travel through the Dream Dimension and hunt there. Fandora uses the power of the jewel Lupia in her crown to summon her powers and allows Kwe to transform into the Fantastic Dragon.

Episodes

Staff & production notes
 Distributor: Nippon Columbia Co., Ltd.
 Planning/Production: Hiro Media, Kaname Production
 General producer: Hiromasa Shibazaki
 Original work: Go Nagai
 Director: Kazuyuki Okaseko (OVA 1), Hiroshi Yoshida (OVA 2), Shigenori Kageyama (OVA 3)
 Scenario: Koichi Minade, Takashi Yamada
 Animation coordinator: Shigenori Kageyama (OVA 1, 2)
 Key animation director: Masahiro Shida (OVA 1), Masahiko Imai (OVA 2), Nobuyuki Ikegami (OVA 3)
 Animation: Kaname Production, Studio Giants (OVA 1, 2), Studio Eagle (OVA 1)
 Character design: Hideki Tamura (OVA 1), Mayumi Watanabe (OVA 2, 3), Hideko Yamauchi (OVA 3)
 Art director: Koichi Kudo (OVA 1), Geki Katsumata (OVA 2), Jiro Kono (OVA 3)
 Music: Nozomi Aoki
 Theme songs:
 OVA 1
  lyrics by Maki Kimura, composition by Maki Kimura, arrangement by Nozomi Aoki, song by Ushio Hashimoto
 , lyrics by Alice Sato, composition by Maki Kimura, arrangement by Nozomi Aoki, song by Ushio Hashimoto
OVA 2
 , lyrics by Kazunori Sonobe, composition by Yuichiro Oda, arrangement by Kohei Tanaka, song by Ushio Hashimoto
 , lyrics by Kazunori Sonobe, composition by Yuichiro Oda, arrangement by Kohei Tanaka, song by Ushio Hashimoto
 OVA 3
 , lyrics by Rui Serizawa, composition by Yoshihiro Yonekura, arrangement by Kenji Yamamoto, song by Ushio Hashimoto
 "Endless Way", lyrics by Rui Serizawa, composition by Yoshihiro Yonekura, arrangement by Kenji Yamamoto, song by Mitsuko Horie)
 Cast: Mitsuko Horie (Fandora), Akira Kamiya (Kwe), Makio Inoue (Yog-Sogoth), Keiko Toda (Leimia, OVA 1), Keiko Han (Fontine, OVA 2)
Source(s)

Media

Home video
Besides the original VHS release, the OVA were released in Laserdisc, both individually and in a single package.

Soundtracks
Each OVA had two vinyl records, an EP and an LP album, the first containing the song themes and the second the full background music and song themes. All of them were released by Columbia.

OVA 1

 OVA 2

 OVA 3

Picture books

Appearances in other media
The theme songs of the series are included in several CDs.

Merchandise
At the time of the OVA releases, several goods were available, including postcards, bags, cassette recorders, pencil cases, stationery, etc.

See also
 Dream Hunter Rem, a similar OVA about a "dream hunter" released June 1985, months before Fandora

References

External links
 Mujigen Hunter Fandora  at allcinema
 
 Mujigen Hunter Fandora  at The World of Go Nagai webpage

1985 anime OVAs
Go Nagai
Japanese science fiction novels
Science fiction anime and manga